The Symphony No. 4 in G major by Gustav Mahler was composed from 1899 to 1900, though it incorporates a song originally written in 1892. That song, presents a child's vision of heaven and is sung by a soprano in the symphony's Finale. Both smaller in orchestration and shorter in length than Mahler's earlier symphonies, the Fourth Symphony was initially planned to be in six movements, alternating between three instrumental and three vocal movements.

The premiere was performed in Munich on 25 November 1901 by the composer and the Kaim Orchestra, but it was met with negative audience and critical reception over the work's confusing intentions and perceived inferiority to the more well-received Second Symphony. The premiere was followed by a German tour, a 1901 Berlin premiere, and a 1902 Vienna premiere, which were met with near-unanimous condemnation of the symphony. Mahler conducted further performances of the symphony, sometimes to warm receptions, and the work received its American and British premieres in 1904 and 1905. The symphony's first edition was published in 1902, but Mahler made revisions in 1905, 1910, and 1911. After Mahler's death, the symphony continued to receive performances under conductors such as Willem Mengelberg and Bruno Walter, and its first recording is a 1930 Japanese rendition conducted by Hidemaro Konoye that is also the first electrical recording of any Mahler symphony. The musicologist Donald Mitchell believes the Fourth and its accessibility were largely responsible for the post-war rise in Mahler's popularity.

The symphony uses cyclic form throughout its structure, such as in the anticipations of the Finale's main theme in the previous three movements. The first movement has been characterized as neoclassical in style, save for its complex development section. The second movement consists of scherzos depicting Death at his fiddle, which are contrasted with Ländler-like trios. The third movement's two themes are varied alternately before reaching a triple forte coda, and the Finale comprises verses from  sung in strophes that are separated by refrains of the first movement's opening. Certain themes and motifs in the Fourth Symphony are also found in Mahler's Second, Third, and Fifth Symphonies.

History

Composition
Gustav Mahler's Fourth Symphony is the last of the composer's three  symphonies (the others being his Second and Third Symphonies). These works incorporated themes originating in Mahler's  (The Boy's Magic Horn), a song cycle setting poems from the folk poetry collection of the same name. The core of the Fourth Symphony is an earlier song,  ("The Heavenly Life"), set to text from  but not included in Mahler's song cycle. Mahler considered the song both the inspiration and goal of the Fourth Symphony, calling it the "tapering spire of the edifice." Fragments of it are heard in the first three movements before it is sung in its entirety by a solo soprano in the fourth movement.

Mahler completed  in 1892, as part of a collection of five  (Humoresques) for voice and orchestra. The poem describes scenes and characters from a child's vision of heaven. In 1895, Mahler considered using the song as the sixth and final movement of his Third Symphony. While remnants of  can be found in the Third Symphony's first, fourth, and fifth movements—including a quotation of the song in the fifth movement's  ("Three Angels were Singing")—Mahler eventually decided to withdraw the song from the work. He instead opted to use the song as the finale of a new symphony, his Fourth. Consequently, there are particularly strong thematic and programmatic connections between the Third and the Fourth through , though the composer also realized that the Fourth was closely related to his First and Second Symphonies as well. Natalie Bauer-Lechner describes the Fourth Symphony as the conclusion to the "perfectly self-contained tetralogy" of Mahler's first four symphonies: the First depicts heroic suffering and triumph; the Second explores death and resurrection; the Third contemplates existence and God; and the Fourth, as an extension of the Third's ideas, explores life in heaven.

According to Paul Bekker's 1921 synopsis of the symphony, Mahler made an early program sketch titled  that has the following six-movement form:

However, the symphony would be modified until only the program sketch's first and last movements would be realized as their respective movements in the symphony's final form, resulting in a Fourth Symphony of normal symphonic length (around 45 minutes) as opposed to the composer's significantly longer earlier symphonies.

During Mahler's 1899 summer vacation in Bad Aussee, the Fourth Symphony, in Bauer-Lechner's words, "fell into his lap just in the nick of time" in late July. The vacation served as Mahler's only chance during the entire year when he was free to compose, but his productivity heretofore was hindered by poor weather and listening to what he called "ghastly health-resort music". As the vacation neared its end, Mahler worked on the symphony for ten days, during which he drafted "about half" of the three instrumental movements and sketched the variations of the Adagio third movement, according to Bauer-Lechner. Mahler finished the Fourth during his summer vacation in Maiernigg the next year; following another bout of unproductivity that summer, Mahler eventually found his working rhythm and completed the symphony's  (first full orchestral score) on 5 August 1900. The symphony's completion suddenly left Mahler feeling "empty and depressed because life has lost all meaning", and Bauer-Lechner reports that he was "deeply upset to have lost such an important part of his life" composing the work.

Later that year during the Christmas holidays, Mahler revised the Scherzo second movement, finalizing its orchestration on 5 January 1901. Though Mahler published his programs for the First and Second symphonies, he refrained from publishing a program for the Fourth. In the words of the musicologist James L. Zychowicz, Mahler intended for "the music to exist on its own." Mahler was also opposed to giving any titles for the symphony's movements, despite having "devised some marvelous ones", because he did not want critics and audiences to "misunderstand and distort them in the worst possible way."

Premiere
During the first half of 1901, Richard Strauss considered conducting the first complete performance of Mahler's Third Symphony. However, Strauss, unsure whether he had enough time to prepare the Third's premiere, wrote to Mahler on 3 July asking whether he could conduct the Fourth's premiere instead. Mahler in his response revealed that he had already promised the premiere to Munich, "where the Kaim Orchestra and the Odeon are having such a tug-of-war over it that I'm finding it hard to try to choose between them". The Vienna Philharmonic had also asked Mahler several times whether they could perform the symphony's premiere, but Mahler by then had promised the premiere to Felix Weingartner, head of the Kaim Orchestra. Not long after the exchanges with the Philharmonic, the composer asked for Weingartner's permission sometime in August or September 1901 to conduct the premiere himself, citing his anxiety over the symphony and its performance.

Eventually, it was planned for Mahler to conduct the Kaim Orchestra in Munich for the world premiere, after which Weingartner and the Kaim Orchestra would perform the work on tour in various German cities and Mahler himself would conduct another performance in Berlin. To review the symphony's orchestration before its publication, Mahler arranged a reading rehearsal with the Vienna Philharmonic on 12 October that doubled as a rehearsal of the Vienna premiere scheduled for January next year. Mahler was not satisfied with the results, making corrections to the score and fully rehearsing the work four times before the symphony's premiere. Though the Munich premiere was originally planned for 18 November, Mahler requested in late October that Weingartner postpone the performance to 25 November, citing "insurmountable difficulties". He also opposed including a vocal work before the symphony in the premiere's program, as he wanted the Finale's soprano "to come as a complete surprise". Henry-Louis de La Grange writes: "the Fourth Symphony had cost Mahler more toil and anguish than the monumental symphonies that had preceded it, and, notwithstanding he was apprehensive of the reactions of its first audience, he secretly hoped that its modest dimensions and the clarity of its style would finally win him the approval of both the public and the musicians."

The world premiere of the symphony was performed on 25 November 1901 in Munich at the Kaim-Saal, with Mahler conducting the Kaim Orchestra and Margarete Michalek as soprano. Bauer-Lechner writes that the first movement was met with both applause and boos since a number in the audience were "unable to follow the complexity of events in the development". The Scherzo proved more confusing to the audience and received further vocal derision. Michalek's performance in the Finale "saved the day"; her youth and charm was said to have "poured oil on the troubled waters". Despite this, the premiere left many in its audience incensed, as the Munich press was quick to report. The , though praising the first movement, described the symphony as "not readily accessible and, in any case, impossible to judge after only one hearing". It also criticized the work's "pretensions" and unjustified use of "the grotesquely comic" before accusing it of "[trespassing] against the Holy Spirit of music". The  and the  both expressed disappointment when comparing Mahler's Fourth to what they considered his superior Second Symphony; the former assessed the Fourth to be a "succession of disjointed and heterogeneous atmospheres and expressions mixed with instrumental quirks and affectations" while the latter said the work was full of "incredible cacophony". Likewise,  claimed that "the bad seeds" in parts of the Second grew into "immense spiky thistles" in the Fourth.

Subsequent performances and reception

Weingartner and the Kaim Orchestra's tour of the symphony, with Michalek as soloist, performed in Nuremberg (26 November 1901), Darmstadt (27 November), Frankfurt (28 November), Karlsruhe (29 November), and Stuttgart (30 November). Most of the cities gave unanimously negative receptions towards the Fourth, with Stuttgart being the sole exception. A false report of a successful Munich premiere prompted some applause after the Nuremberg performance, but the city's  gave a harsh review of Mahler's "Vaudeville-Symphony", praising only its orchestration. In Karlsruhe, the concert began with a near-empty audience, and Weingartner chose only to conduct the symphony's Finale. The Stuttgart press was mixed: the  praised Mahler as a rising star and considered the work a "wreath of good-humored melodies and folk dances"; on the other hand, the  condemned the symphony for its "vulgar passages". The tour's failure discouraged Mahler and traumatized Weingartner; the latter never conducted a piece by Mahler again.

The Berlin premiere was performed on 16 December 1901 at the Berlin Opera, with Mahler conducting the Berliner Tonkünstler Orchestra and Thila Plaichinger as soprano. Mahler also conducted for the Vienna premiere on 12 January 1902 at the Großer Musikvereinsaal, which was performed by the Vienna Philharmonic and Michalek. Once again, the reception was a near-unanimous condemnation of the symphony, including criticism from reviewers Max Kalbeck, Theodor Helm, Richard Heuberger, and Max Graf.

Mahler conducted a 23 January 1903 performance at the Kurhaus, Wiesbaden, where he was surprised by the friendly reception. That year later saw a performance in Düsseldorf. On 23 March 1904, the composer conducted the Fourth at the Staatstheater Mainz, which received warm applause but reviews criticizing the work's "naïveté". This was followed by a number of international performances. In 1904, Mahler traveled to Amsterdam to conduct a double performance of the symphony on 23 October at the Royal Concertgebouw with the Concertgebouw Orchestra and the soloist Alida Lütkemann. The American premiere on 6 November 1904 in New York City saw Walter Damrosch conduct the New York Symphony Society and the soprano Etta de Montjau. The British premiere on 25 October 1905 was a Prom concert given by Henry Wood, who conducted the New Queen's Hall Orchestra and his wife, Olga Wood, as soprano. Mahler conducted another performance on 18 January 1907, this time in Frankfurt's Saalbau. Mahler's last performances of the symphony were with the New York Philharmonic and the soprano Bella Alten in Carnegie Hall on 17 and 20 January 1911.

In the Amsterdam Mahler Festival of May 1920, the Concertgebouw Orchestra under Willem Mengelberg's direction performed nine concerts during which Mahler's complete opus was played for the first time. During the 1940s, the Fourth received performances from the London Philharmonic Orchestra conducted by Anatole Fistoulari and the BBC Symphony Orchestra conducted by Adrian Boult, contributing to what Donald Mitchell calls "the Mahler 'boom' in England".

Despite Mahler's contemporaries' negative criticism, Mitchell believes that the Fourth "above all [was] the agent of changed attitudes to Mahler in the years after the Second World War" because its relatively modest resources and length, its approachability, and its appeal eventually won "admiring audiences". In 1973, Kurt Blaukopf stated that of Mahler's symphonies, the Fourth "became popular most quickly". In 2005, Zychowicz wrote that the Fourth, in which the composer was "uncannily concise", remains one of Mahler's most accessible compositions.

Instrumentation
The symphony is scored for a smaller orchestra compared to Mahler's other symphonies, and there are no parts for trombone or tuba. Paul Stefan notes the "fairly numerous" woodwinds and strings, while Michael Steinberg calls the percussion section "lavish". The instrumentation is as follows:

Woodwinds

 4 flutes (3rd and 4th doubling piccolos)
 3 oboes (3rd doubling cor anglais)
 
 3 bassoons (3rd doubling contrabassoon)
Brass
 4 horns
 3 trumpets

Percussion
 4 timpani
 bass drum
 cymbals
 triangle
 sleigh bells
 tam-tam
 glockenspiel

Voices
 soprano solo (used only in fourth movement)

Strings
 harp
 1st violins
 2nd violins
 violas
 cellos
 double basses

Structure

Although Mahler described the symphony's key as G major, the work employs a progressive tonal scheme of B minor/G major to E major, as classified in The New Grove Dictionary of Music and Musicians. The symphony is in four movements:

Deryck Cooke estimates the symphony's duration to be 50 minutes, a moderate length for a symphony that Mahler considered to be "of normal dimensions". La Grange gives the following movement durations based on Mahler's 1904 Amsterdam performance, which took a longer 57 minutes:

I. 
Cooke characterizes the first movement as a "pastoral 'walk through the countryside' movement", and it is one of Mahler's shortest first movements. The introduction in B minor is played by flutes and sleigh bells:

The first theme in G major is then heard, marked  (very leisurely):

Constantin Floros calls the first theme "remarkably short", and Theodor Adorno notices a Schubert-like sound in it. La Grange compares the first theme to a similar passage in the first movement exposition of Schubert's Piano Sonata in E-flat major, D. 568. The second theme is in D major, marked  (broadly sung):

Floros identifies a similarity between this theme and a theme from the first movement of Beethoven's Piano Sonata No. 13. The exposition closes with a coda marked  (very calm again). Mitchell finds that the themes, textures, and rhythms of the exposition suggest Neoclassicism, but Mahler's style changes in the ensuing development section when "a radically different sound-world manifests itself".

Floros comments on the development's "extraordinary complexity" in his analysis; he divides the development into eight parts, some of which explore distant minor keys and distort the main theme from the Finale. The development climaxes in its eighth part on a dissonant fortissimo followed by a trumpet fanfare that Mahler named  ("The little summons" or "The little call to order"); he later used this trumpet call as the opening theme to the Fifth Symphony. The recapitulation section reaches what Stefan describes as "an almost Mozartian jubilation" towards its end, and the movement concludes with a calm and slow coda.

II. 

The second movement has a five-part structure, beginning with a scherzo part in C minor that alternates with a trio part in F major. The scherzo's prelude presents a horn call, followed by what Stefan terms a "ghostly theme"  in a solo scordatura violin that begins the scherzo's first section in C minor.

A brighter middle section in C major is then heard, before a reprisal of the C minor section. The scherzo closes with a horn postlude. The two trios between the movement's three scherzos have the character of a Ländler and are in a "lazily cheerful" style that contrasts with the scherzo's grotesqueness. La Grange describes the second movement as Mahler's "only true ländler movement" since the First Symphony's Scherzo. Floros finds that certain melodies in the trio anticipate themes from the Finale.

The scherzo was originally named  ("Friend Hein Strikes Up", or "Death takes the fiddle" as paraphrased by Cooke).  is a personification of Death in German folklore, and his fiddling is represented in the music by the harsh sound of the scordatura violin. The printed program for the 1904 Amsterdam performance even included the title  ("Dance of Death") for the movement, though this was never published in the symphony's first edition. According to Mahler's widow, Alma, the composer took inspiration for this movement from the 1872 painting Self-Portrait with Death Playing the Fiddle by the Swiss artist Arnold Böcklin. Blaukopf writes that the violin passages betray "Mahler's penchant for the ludicrous and the eerie". Despite this, he notes that  "is not frightening in effect" but is instead "uncanny". Stefan characterizes Mahler's depiction of Death as "very good-natured".

III.  
The third movement is an adagio set of double theme and variations. La Grange however believes that this "variations on two themes" interpretation of the movement is inaccurate because the second theme is "not genuinely 'varied', but only amplified when restated". Mahler called the movement his "first real variations", and he composed it under the inspiration of "a vision of a tombstone on which was carved an image of the departed, with folded arms, in eternal sleep". The musicologist Philip Barford deems the music to be "of profound, meditative beauty".

Floros divides the movement into five main parts (A – B – A – B – A) followed by a coda. The first theme in G major is played in the beginning of part A by the cellos:

Cooke calls the opening "a transfigured cradle song". Floros views part A's structure as bar form (two —the first theme followed by its variation—and an ) with an Appendix. Part A closes with a bass motif, which both Bekker and Floros find "bell-like"; to the latter, the motif is reminiscent of the bell motif from Wagner's Parsifal. La Grange writes that the ostinato bass motif is "always present in some form or other" and gives the movement "a strong passacaglia feeling". Part B, marked  (much slower), is in three sections and also resembles the bar form structure. In the first section, the oboe introduces the lamenting E minor second theme, which is varied in the second section that climaxes in a fortissimo.

Part A is a variation of part A marked  (graceful and lively), and Floros describes part B as "a very free" and far more intense variation of part B. La Grange identifies part A as the "first variation proper" of part A; the first theme undergoes four variations of increasing tempo, reaching Allegro molto before a sudden return to Andante. Part A concludes with a variation of part A's  that fades away into the coda.

Floros calls the coda's introduction "the most splendid passage ... of the entire Symphony". A triple forte E major chord is played by the winds and strings, and the bass motif is reprised by the timpani and double basses. The horns and trumpets then play the main theme of the Finale before the volume rapidly decreases.

IV. 
La Grange analyzes the fourth movement as a strophic  in three main sections separated by orchestral refrains and ending with a coda. An orchestral prelude in G major begins the Finale:

The verse is sung "with childishly gay expression" over text describing the joys of heaven. A contrasting verse (second strophe) depicts a heavenly feast and is sung in E minor; this verse closes with another choralelike figure before the bell refrain returns for the interlude. The third strophe (comprising the third and fourth verses of the text) is in G major again and is sung over a variation of the first strophe's theme and form. After the bell refrain is played once more, the coda's pastoral introduction in E major is heard. This orchestral passage is marked  (very gentle and mysterious until the end), and the final strophe that follows is sung in E major over a variation of the main theme. This strophe corresponds to the text's final verse with images of "most gentle restfulness", and Mitchell calls it "an extraordinary experience without parallel elsewhere in Mahler". The coda ends on an orchestral postlude in pianissimo that gradually fades away. Adorno finds that there is an ambiguity as to whether the music and its heavenly vision has "fallen asleep for ever", and David Schiff interprets the Finale's depiction of Heaven as "untouchable, outside experience". Both agree that the Finale's promises of joy are present yet unattainable.

Fourth movement text

Revisions and publication
Following the 1901 world premiere, Mahler revised the symphony a number of times, including changes in instrumentation, dynamics, and articulation for Julius Buths; revisions for a 3 November 1905 performance in Graz; changes made in the summer of 1910; and Mahler's last autographed revisions in 1911, made after his final performances of the symphony in New York.

The symphony was later taken up by the Vienna publisher Universal Edition, which reprinted the score in octavo format. Universal Edition published a subsequent edition in 1906, incorporating Mahler's early revisions, and reprinted this edition in 1910 and 1925. However, Universal Edition failed to carry out any of Mahler's further changes since the 1906 edition. Publishing rights of some of the symphony's editions were later transferred to Boosey & Hawkes, but their 1943 edition also failed to include Mahler's late revisions. Universal Edition eventually published a new edition in 1963, which saw Erwin Ratz incorporate Mahler's yet unincluded revisions. These changes were met with criticism from Hans Redlich, who wrote in 1966: "Only the musical texts of the Symphony published between 1902 and 1910 carry full authenticity for posterity."

Josef Venantius von Wöss arranged the symphony for four-hands piano, a version which was on sale at the time of the symphony's first publishing. Erwin Stein's 1921 and Klaus Simon's 2007 arrangements both call for a reduced orchestration, though the former is scored for a smaller ensemble than the latter since Stein omits the bassoon and horn parts.

Recordings

The Fourth Symphony was first commercially recorded on 28 and 29 May 1930, with 
Hidemaro Konoye conducting the New Symphony Orchestra of Tokyo and the soprano Sakaye Kitasaya. The recording was released under Japanese Parlophone and is the first electrical recording of any Mahler symphony. Since then, the symphony has been recorded by ensembles in Europe, the United States, and Japan, including multiple recordings each from the New York Philharmonic, the Vienna Philharmonic, and the Concertgebouw Orchestra.  In his 2020 Gramophone review of Fourth Symphony recordings, David Gutman selects Iván Fischer (2008), Willem Mengelberg (1939), Lorin Maazel (1983), and Claudio Abbado's (2009) interpretations of the symphony for his choice recordings, while also sampling recordings conducted by Simon Rattle (1997), Leonard Bernstein (1960), Otto Klemperer (1961), and Michael Tilson Thomas (2003).

Footnotes

References

Sources

Books

Other

Further reading
 
 Translated into English in

External links

 
 History and analysis by the Mahler scholar Henry-Louis de La Grange

Symphony No. 04 (Mahler)
1900 compositions
Death in music
Compositions in G major